The Equal Credit Opportunity Act (ECOA) is a United States law (codified at  et seq.), enacted 28 October 1974, that makes it unlawful for any creditor to discriminate against any applicant, with respect to any aspect of a credit transaction, on the basis of race, color, religion, national origin, sex, marital status, or age (provided the applicant has the capacity to contract); the applicant's use of a public assistance program to receive all or part of their income; or the applicant's previous good-faith exercise of any right under the Consumer Credit Protection Act. The law applies to any person who, in the ordinary course of business, regularly participates in a credit decision, including banks, retailers, bankcard companies, finance companies, and credit unions.

The part of the law that defines its authority and scope is known as Regulation B, from the (b) that appears in Title 12 part 1002's official identifier: 12 C.F.R. § 1002.1(b) (2017). Failure to comply with Regulation B can subject a financial institution to civil liability for actual and punitive damages in individual or class actions. Liability for punitive damages can be as much as $10,000 in individual actions and the lesser of $500,000 or 1% of the creditor's net worth in class actions.

Before the enactment of the law, lenders and the federal government frequently and explicitly discriminated against female loan applicants and held female applicants to different standards from male applicants. A large coalition of women's and civil rights groups pressured the government to pass the ECOA (and the Housing and Community Development Act of 1974) to prohibit such discrimination.

Prohibitions
Among other things, the ECOA states that it is illegal for creditors to:
Discriminate based on race, sex, age, national origin, or marital status, or because one receives public assistance.
Ask about marital status if a candidate is applying for separate, unsecured credit, with one exception: one can be asked about marital status if one lives in a community property state. No matter what the state of residence is, joint credit (credit shared by a married couple) or credit secured with property is exempt from this.
Ask the candidate if they plan to have children or additional children, but creditors can ask about the number, ages, and financial obligations relating to all existing children.
Disallow regular sources of income, such as reliable veteran's benefits, welfare payments, Social Security payments, alimony, child support, etc.  Nor may they refuse to consider or discount any income earned from a part-time job, pension, annuity, or retirement benefits program.

Requirements
The ECOA states that creditors must:
Provide the applicant with a notification of action taken within 30 calendar days of receiving a completed application, unless certain exceptions apply. These notifications of action taken are sometimes required to be in writing, while in other cases, oral notification satisfies the Regulation's requirement.
Give the specific reason(s) (or let the candidate know how to get the reason(s)) why one is denied credit or granted credit in a way different from the terms under which they originally applied. This same rule applies if a creditor closes the account, refuses to increase a line of credit, makes a negative change in the terms of the credit and doesn't make the same change for other consumers, or refuses to give credit at the same, or approximately the same, terms as were offered when the credit was initially applied for.

Scope additions
When the Banking committee marked up the ECOA, congresswoman Lindy Boggs added the provision banning discrimination due to sex or marital status without informing the other members of the committee beforehand, personally inserting the language on her own and photocopying new versions of the bill. She then told the other committee members, "Knowing the members composing this committee as well as I do, I'm sure it was just an oversight that we didn't have 'sex' or 'marital status' included. I've taken care of that, and I trust it meets with the committee's approval." The committee unanimously approved the bill.

References

Further reading

External links
Annual Report to Congress on the Equal Credit Opportunity Act – These annual reports by the Board of Governors of the Federal Reserve System discuss actions taken in response to the Equal Credit Opportunity Act.
Public Law 93-495, 93d Congress, H.R. 11221: An Act To Increase Deposit Insurance From $20,000 To $40,000, To Provide Full Insurance For Public Unit Deposits Of $100,000 Per Account, To Establish A National Commission On Electronic Fund Transfers, And For Other Purposes; Equal Credit Opportunity Act; Fair Credit Billing Act

Anti-discrimination law in the United States
United States federal banking legislation
United States federal civil rights legislation
Credit